Sam was one of the four members (No In, Han Eum, Sam and Wang Gyeop) who operated the government of Wiman Joseon. He was a chancellor of Nigye (Hangul:니계 Hanja:尼谿) and it was where he based himself for. He was the only one who did not have family name in those 4 members. In BC 109 to 108, when Han dynasty attacked Wiman Joseon, those three exiles from China, No In, Han Eum and Wang Gyeop surrendered instantly while leaving the King of Wiman Joseon Ugeo and Sam was only one who resisted against Han dynasty among those members. However, in BC 108, Sam sent an assassin to Ugeo, killed him and surrendered to Han dynasty. After his surrender, he was nominated as a peerage of  Hwae Cheong (Hangul:홰청 Hanja:澅清) by Han dynasty. 11 years later, he was arrested on suspicion of hiding the fugitive from Wiman Joseon and died of illness while he was in prison.

See also
Han conquest of Gojoseon

References

Sources

註 042

Wiman Joseon people
People who died in prison custody
Korean politicians
2nd-century BC Korean people
1st-century BC Korean people